Manoel Lourenço da Silva Filho (born 2 February 1978), known simply as Manoel, is a Brazilian retired footballer who played as a centre forward.

Football career
Born in Feira de Santana, Bahia, Manoel started his professional career with Sport Club Internacional. In January 1999 he moved abroad and signed for PSV Eindhoven in the Netherlands, but returned shortly after to his country.

Manoel would spend the following seven years in Portugal, playing for Vitória de Guimarães, Gil Vicente FC (scoring ten Primeira Liga goals in the 2002–03 season as the Barcelos club finished eighth) and Moreirense FC. In the 2005 summer he joined Sporting Clube de Portugal, but was immediately loaned to Vitória Guimarães and never appeared officially for the Lions; during his spell with the Minho side he failed to find the net in the league, in an eventual relegation-ending campaign.

After starting 2006–07 with C.F. Os Belenenses, also in the top flight, Manoel left Portugal and returned to his country, with lowly Clube de Regatas Brasil. In the following years he moved teams – and continents – constantly, playing for teams in Bulgaria, China and Bahrain.

External links

1978 births
Living people
Brazilian footballers
Association football forwards
Campeonato Brasileiro Série A players
Campeonato Brasileiro Série B players
Sport Club Internacional players
Esporte Clube Bahia players
Clube de Regatas Brasil players
PSV Eindhoven players
Primeira Liga players
Vitória S.C. players
Gil Vicente F.C. players
Moreirense F.C. players
Sporting CP footballers
C.F. Os Belenenses players
China League One players
Shanghai Shenxin F.C. players
First Professional Football League (Bulgaria) players
OFC Vihren Sandanski players
Brazilian expatriate footballers
Expatriate footballers in the Netherlands
Expatriate footballers in Portugal
Expatriate footballers in China
Expatriate footballers in Bulgaria
Expatriate footballers in Bahrain
Brazilian expatriate sportspeople in Portugal
Saad Esporte Clube players
Sportspeople from Bahia
People from Feira de Santana